Darwin is the core Unix operating system of macOS (previously OS X and Mac OS X), iOS, watchOS, tvOS, iPadOS and bridgeOS. It previously existed as an independent open-source operating system, first released by Apple Inc. in 2000. It is composed of code derived from NeXTSTEP, BSD, Mach, and other free software projects' code, as well as code developed by Apple.

Darwin is mostly POSIX-compatible, but has never, by itself, been certified as compatible with any version of POSIX. Starting with Leopard, macOS has been certified as compatible with the Single UNIX Specification version 3 (SUSv3).

History
The heritage of Darwin began with Unix derivatives supplemented by aspects of NeXT's NeXTSTEP operating system (later, since version 4.0, known as OPENSTEP), first released in 1989. After Apple bought NeXT in 1996, it announced it would base its next operating system on OPENSTEP. This was developed into Rhapsody in 1997, Mac OS X Server 1.0 in 1999, Mac OS X Public Beta in 2000, and Mac OS X 10.0 in 2001.

In 1999, Apple announced it would release the source code for the Mach 2.5 microkernel, BSD Unix 4.4 OS, and the Apache Web server components of Mac OS X Server. At the time, interim CEO Steve Jobs alluded to British naturalist Charles Darwin by announcing "because it's about evolution". In 2000, the core operating system components of Mac OS X were released as open-source software under the Apple Public Source License (APSL) as Darwin; the higher-level components, such as the Cocoa and Carbon frameworks, remained closed-source.

Up to Darwin 8.0.1, Apple released a binary installer (as an ISO image) after each major Mac OS X release that allowed one to install Darwin on PowerPC and Intel x86 systems as a standalone operating system. Minor updates were released as packages that were installed separately. Darwin is now only available as source code. As of January 2023, Apple no longer mentions Darwin by name on its Open Source website and only publishes an incomplete collection of open-source projects relating to macOS and iOS.

Design

Kernel

The kernel of Darwin is XNU, a hybrid kernel which uses OSFMK 7.3 (Open Software Foundation Mach Kernel) from the OSF, various elements of FreeBSD (including the process model, network stack, and virtual file system), and an object-oriented device driver API called I/O Kit. The hybrid kernel design provides the flexibility of a microkernel and the performance of a monolithic kernel.

Hardware and software support
Darwin currently includes support for the 64-bit x86-64 variant of the Intel x86 processors used in Intel-based Macs and the 64-bit ARM processors used in the iPhone 5S and later, the 6th generation iPod Touch, the 5th generation iPad and later, the iPad Air family, the iPad Mini 2 and later, the iPad Pro family, the fourth generation and later Apple TVs, the HomePod family, and Macs with Apple silicon such as the 2020 Apple M1 Macs, as well as the Raspberry Pi 3B. An open-source port of the XNU kernel exists that supports Darwin on Intel and AMD x86 platforms not officially supported by Apple, though it does not appear to have been updated since 2009. An open-source port of the XNU kernel also exists for ARM platforms, though it has not been updated since 2016. Older versions supported some or all of 32-bit PowerPC, 64-bit PowerPC, 32-bit x86, and 32-bit ARM.

It supports the POSIX API by way of its BSD lineage (largely FreeBSD userland) and a large number of programs written for various other UNIX-like systems can be compiled on Darwin with no changes to the source code.

Darwin does not include many of the defining elements of macOS, such as the Carbon and Cocoa APIs or the Quartz Compositor and Aqua user interface, and thus cannot run Mac applications. It does, however, support a number of lesser-known features of macOS, such as mDNSResponder, which is the multicast DNS responder and a core component of the Bonjour networking technology, and launchd, an advanced service management framework.

License
In July 2003, Apple released Darwin under version 2.0 of the Apple Public Source License (APSL), which the Free Software Foundation (FSF) classifies as a free software license incompatible with the GNU General Public License. Previous versions were released under an earlier version of the APSL license, which did not meet the FSF definition of free software, although it did meet the requirements of the Open Source Definition.

Release history
The following is a table of major Darwin releases with their dates of release and their derivative operating system releases. Note that the corresponding releases may have been released on a different date.

Darwin 0–8 and corresponding Mac OS X releases

The jump in version numbers from Darwin 1.4.1 to 5.1 with the release of Mac OS X v10.1.1 was designed to tie Darwin to the Mac OS X version and build numbering system, which in turn is inherited from NeXTSTEP. In the build numbering system of macOS, every version has a unique beginning build number, which identifies what whole version of macOS it is part of. Mac OS X v10.0 had build numbers starting with 4, 10.1 had build numbers starting with 5, and so forth (earlier build numbers represented developer releases).

Darwin 9; iPhone OS introduced

Darwin 10-11; iPhone OS rebranded to iOS

Darwin 12–15; Mac OS X rebranded into OS X

Darwin 16–19; OS X rebranded into macOS

Darwin 20 onwards

Note: the tables above contain the release dates of the corresponding OS releases. Build dates for Darwin versions are not publicly available; the commands below only give the build date for the XNU kernel.

The command  in Terminal will show the Darwin version number ("20.3.0"), and the command  will show the XNU build version string, which includes the Darwin version number.
The command  will show the corresponding ProductName ("macOS"), the ProductVersion number ("11.2.3") and the BuildVersion string ("20D91").

Derived projects
Due to the free software nature of Darwin, there have been projects that aim to modify or enhance the operating system.

OpenDarwin

OpenDarwin was a community-led operating system based on the Darwin system. It was founded in April 2002 by Apple Inc. and Internet Systems Consortium. Its goal was to increase collaboration between Apple developers and the free software community. Apple benefited from the project because improvements to OpenDarwin would be incorporated into Darwin releases; and the free/open source community benefited from being given complete control over its own operating system, which could then be used in free software distributions such as GNU-Darwin.

On July 25, 2006, the OpenDarwin team announced that the project was shutting down, as they felt OpenDarwin had "become a mere hosting facility for Mac OS X related projects", and that the efforts to create a standalone Darwin operating system had failed. They also state: "Availability of sources, interaction with Apple representatives, difficulty building and tracking sources, and a lack of interest from the community have all contributed to this." The last stable release was version 7.2.1, released on July 16, 2004.

PureDarwin
PureDarwin was a project to create a bootable operating system image from Apple's released source code for Darwin. Since the halt of OpenDarwin and the release of bootable images since Darwin 8.x, it has been increasingly difficult to create a full operating system as many components become closed source. In 2015 the project created a preview release based on Darwin 9 with an X11 GUI, followed by a command-line only 17.4 Beta based on Darwin 17.

Other derived projects
 MacPorts (formerly DarwinPorts), Fink, and Homebrew are projects to port UNIX programs to the Darwin operating system and provide package management. In addition, several standard UNIX package managers—such as RPM, pkgsrc, and Portage—have Darwin ports. Some of these operate in their own namespace so as not to interfere with the base system.
 GNU-Darwin is a project that ports packages of free software to Darwin. They package OS images in a way similar to a Linux distribution.
 The Darwine project was a port of Wine that allows one to run Microsoft Windows software on Darwin.
 SEDarwin is a port of TrustedBSD mandatory access control framework and portions of the SELinux framework to Darwin. It was incorporated into Mac OS X 10.5.
 The Darbat project is an experimental port of Darwin to the L4 microkernel family. It aims to be binary compatible with existing Darwin binaries.
 The Darling project is a compatibility layer for running macOS binaries on Linux systems. It uses some Darwin source code.
 There are various projects that focus on driver support: e.g., wireless drivers, wired NIC drivers modem drivers, card readers, and the ext2 and ext3 file systems.
DarwinBSD Project is a Darwin Project using pkgsrc for packages and is a Open Source Project 
http://darwinbsd.tk

See also

 A/UX
 mkLinux
 OSF/1

References

External links
 Darwin Releases at Apple Developer Connection
 source code of individual packages
 Hexley, the Darwin mascot
 PureDarwin.org
 

2000 software
Mascots introduced in 2000
Animal mascots
Apple Inc. operating systems
Berkeley Software Distribution
Fictional monotremes
Free software operating systems
Mach (kernel)
MacOS
Software version histories
Unix variants